Anderson's crocodile newt, Anderson's newt, Ryukyu spiny newt, or Japanese warty newt (Echinotriton andersoni) is a species of salamander in the family Salamandridae found in the Ryukyu Islands of Japan, and, at least formerly, Mount Guanyin in northern Taiwan, where it is now believed to be extinct.

Description
Echinotriton andersoni is a stout, flat salamander. Head is broad and triangular in shape. There are 12–15 conspicuous knob-like lateral glands. Colouration is uniformly dark brown or black, only the underside of the tail, cloacal region, and the soles of the feet are yellow-orange.

Habitat and conservation
Its natural habitats are broad-leaved evergreen forests, secondary forests, grasslands and swamps. It has also been found in and near sugar cane fields. It breeds in standing water such as ponds and temporary pools; outside breeding season it is difficult to observe as adult salamanders live in leaf litter, in rocky crevices, and under rocks and logs.

Echinotriton andersoni is uncommon, and it is threatened by habitat loss and by collection for illegal pet trade.

See also
Anderson's salamander (Ambystoma andersoni)

References

Newts
Amphibians of Japan
Amphibians of Taiwan
Taxonomy articles created by Polbot
Amphibians described in 1892